"The Phoenix" is a song by American rock band Fall Out Boy for their fifth studio album Save Rock and Roll (2013). The song was written by the band in collaboration with Butch Walker, who handled production. After being released to digital outlets on March 24, 2013, in advance of the album's release, "The Phoenix" impacted radio on July 16, 2013 as an official single. The song charted for 1 week then fell off. An accompanying music video was also released as part of the ongoing series The Young Blood Chronicles, serving as a prequel to the video of the album's lead single "My Songs Know What You Did in the Dark (Light Em Up)".

"The Phoenix" contains elements of Russian composer Dmitri Shostakovich's Symphony No. 7 in C major. Prior to its official release as a single, the song debuted at number 80 on the United States Billboard Hot 100 on the strength of digital sales and also charted in several other countries, including Australia, Canada and the United Kingdom. It won the Kerrang! Award for Best Single in 2013.

Composition
The song was inspired by Soviet Russian composer Dmitri Shostakovich and drum loops, both of which Stump was interested in at one point in the recording process. While listening to the fourth movement (Allegro non troppo) of Shostakovich's Symphony No. 7, Stump became entranced by a certain string moment and proceeded to build an entirely new song influenced by it. The same orchestral snippet was employed as a sample by German hip-hop artist Peter Fox in his 2008 single Alles neu. The tempo of the song is 138 BPM, and it is written in the key of E minor.

Music video
"The Phoenix" is the second of eleven videos in The Young Blood Chronicles series. This video follows that of "My Songs Know What You Did in the Dark (Light Em Up)" and precedes "Young Volcanoes."

Video synopsis
A steel brief case with glowing contents is delivered to Fall Out Boy. Trohman handcuffs Stump's hands to the case and he heads out. As he walks down the street looking for predators, a boy on a bicycle approaches him. As he is staring at the bicycle boy a hooded woman sneaks up behind him, then tases and kidnaps him. They bring him to a dark room with vixens. The vixens torture him in various ways then chop off his hand and have the boy deliver it to Wentz while at his girlfriend's house. Finding the chopped hand in the bag, Wentz frees a falcon on a rooftop. Nearby band member Hurley sees it right before getting kidnapped by vixens in a parking lot via truck, and Trohman gets kidnapped in a gas station. Wentz gets kidnapped on the rooftop. Meanwhile, the vixens continue to torture Stump by laying him on a flatbed while sticking probes into his body and removing some of his organs. Stump is then strapped to a chair following the next video, "Young Volcanoes." The screen blanks out after Stump snaps.

Charts

Weekly charts

Year-end charts

Certifications

Release history

In popular culture
This song is used in the gameplay trailer of the wrestling video game WWE 2K14.

In 2023, it is used in South Korea's Terra commercial.

References

2013 singles
Fall Out Boy songs
2013 songs
Songs written by Pete Wentz
Songs written by Patrick Stump
Songs written by Joe Trohman
Songs written by Andy Hurley
Island Records singles
Song recordings produced by Butch Walker